Nenad Jovanovic (born 9 November 1979) is a Serbian-Austrian footballer.

References

Austrian footballers
Austrian Football Bundesliga players
1979 births
Living people
DSV Leoben players
Wolfsberger AC players

Association football defenders